The Bellarmine Knights men's basketball team represents Bellarmine University in Louisville, Kentucky, United States. The Knights compete in the ASUN Conference and are currently transitioning to NCAA Division I. The team competed in the Great Lakes Valley Conference (GLVC) from the conference's founding in 1972 through the 2019–20 season. They are currently led by head coach Scott Davenport and play their home games at Freedom Hall.

History 
The program began in 1950, coinciding with the opening of Bellarmine College. The team played its first game on December 27, 1950, against St. Mary's College. The team joined the Kentucky Intercollegiate Athletic Conference (KIAC) in 1951 and remained in the conference until 1964. The Knights won the program's first conference title under Alex Groza when the team won the 1963 KIAC regular season and tournament titles. In addition Groza was named the KIAC coach of the year. That season also marked the first bid to the NCAA College Division, now Division II, basketball tournament.

Over the past 10 years, BU became one of the country's premier NCAA Division II college basketball programs. The Knights won five Great Lakes Valley Conference (GLVC) tournament championships in 2009–10, 2010–11, 2016–17, 2017–18, 2018–19 and won GLVC regular season champion in 2010–11, 2011–12, 2014–15, 2015–16, 2016–17, and 2017–18. In NCAA postseason play, the Knights made 11-straight NCAA DII postseason appearances from 2009–2019, including four Division II Final Four appearances and won the 2011 NCAA Division II men's basketball tournament. The 2011 victory marked the first athletic national championship in the university's history.

It was on March 26, 2011, that the Knights won their first NCAA Division II National Championship, led by guards Jeremy Kendle and Braydon Hobbs. The Knights defeated BYU–Hawaii for the title, 71–68. The championship game aired on national television on the CBS network. An estimated 2,906 fans were in attendance for the championship game, most of which were Bellarmine fans that had made the  trip from Louisville to watch the Knights compete in the championship held in Springfield, Massachusetts at the MassMutual Center.

Division I transition 
On June 19, 2019, the university's athletic program officially announced it accepted an invitation to join the ASUN Conference and transition to NCAA Division I beginning in the 2020–21 school year. The transition has sent the Knights, a Division II perennial power during the first two decades of the 21st century, into a multiyear transition process. During the four-year process to transition, Bellarmine is competing at the Division I level but cannot qualify for NCAA-organized postseason play (i.e., the Division I tournament and the NIT). The Knights can compete in postseason events not organized by the NCAA, currently the College Basketball Invitational and The Basketball Classic.

After a preseason shutdown due to the COVID-19 pandemic, the Knights ended up playing their first ever game at the Division I level on the road against the sixth-ranked Duke Blue Devils. It was a historic night for the program albeit in a quieter than usual Cameron Indoor Stadium. Despite staying close for the first half, Bellarmine ended up falling short to Duke, 76–54. Junior guard Dylan Penn entered the history books during the game, as he was responsible for scoring the first ever points in Bellarmine’s history at the Division I level. 

Two days after the loss to Duke, Bellarmine made a different kind of history for the program, which was undoubtedly more positive. On December 6th, 2020, the Knights traveled to the doorsteps of Howard University and dismantled the Bison 84–63 to notch their first ever win at the Division I level.  

Bellarmine had a very successful first season at the Division I level. They dropped their first two games of ASUN conference play to Lipscomb, but they did not let that deter them. The Knights rattled off 10 consecutive wins to send a strong message to the rest of the conference. They went undefeated on the road in conference play, with a 6–0 record. At one point, Bellarmine had the fourth longest winning streak in the country.  

The Knights were so successful that their regular season finale against Liberty got moved to ESPNU, because it was a de facto winner-take-all game for the regular-season conference championship. Bellarmine fell short, 94–78, but they achieved a COVID sellout of over 2,700 fans.  

The Knights were ineligible for the NCAA tournament and the NIT, but they were invited to the 2021 CBI Tournament. Held in Daytona Beach, Florida, Bellarmine defeated Army, 77–67, in the quarterfinals of the tournament, before falling short to Pepperdine, 82–71, in the semifinals.  

After being picked to finish last in the conference during the preseason, Bellarmine finished their first Division I season with a 14–8 overall record, including a 10–3 mark in conference play that helped them finish second in the ASUN. They also recorded the first Division I postseason victory in program history. Forward Pedro Bradshaw and guard Dylan Penn were honored for their outstanding seasons, as Bradshaw was the runner-up for ASUN Player of the Year and was a unanimous All-ASUN First Team selection, while Penn also earned All-ASUN First Team honors.

Postseason

CBI results
The Knights have appeared in one College Basketball Invitational (CBI). Their record is 1–1.

NCAA Division II tournament results
The Knights have appeared in the NCAA Division II Tournament 20 times; they have 1 National Title (2010), 4 trips to the Elite Eight and a record of 32-22 (.593)

Record year-by-year

 Totals updated through 2020–21 season.

Facilities
The Knights played their home games at Knights Hall in Louisville from the venue's opening in 1960 through the 2019–20 season. It has a capacity of 2,196 and also hosts the school's volleyball team.

On November 2, 2020, the university announced a multi-year deal with the Kentucky State Fair Board to use Freedom Hall, located at the Kentucky Exposition Center near Louisville Muhammad Ali International Airport, for men's and women's basketball home games. Due to COVID-19 restrictions, the Knights would have been able to seat only 300 at their on-campus facility. Freedom Hall's basketball capacity of 18,252 allowed Bellarmine to seat 2,700 for games in its first D-I season. Freedom Hall, which opened in 1956, is best known as having been home to Louisville Cardinals men's basketball from its opening until the 2010 opening of the KFC Yum! Center in downtown Louisville, and was also home to the Kentucky Colonels of the old ABA.

References

External links
 

 
Basketball teams established in 1950